Bradley Maxon Hamlett was a Democratic member of the Montana Legislature. He was elected to Senate District 10, representing Cascade, Montana, in 2009 and 2011. He served District 15 in 2013 and 2015 due to redistricting.

References

Living people
Year of birth missing (living people)
Democratic Party Montana state senators
People from Cascade, Montana
21st-century American politicians